Maneater is a 2009 television miniseries starring Sarah Chalke. It was directed by Timothy Busfield and written by Suzanne Martin and Gigi Levangie. This miniseries aired on Lifetime on May 30, 2009 and May 31, 2009.

Cast
 Sarah Chalke as Clarissa Alpert
 Marla Sokoloff as Jennifer
 Judy Greer as Gravy
 Philip Winchester as Aaron Mason
 Gregory Harrison as Teddy Alpert
 María Conchita Alonso as Alejandra Alpert
 Paul Leyden as Simon
 Garcelle Beauvais-Nilon as Suzee
 Noureen DeWulf as Polo
 Shalim Ortiz as Pablo Hernandez
 Ramsey Bergeron as Bouncer
 T.D. Ahlers as Wedding Guest

External links

2009 television films
2009 films
2000s American television miniseries
Lifetime (TV network) films
Television series by 3 Arts Entertainment
Television series by Sony Pictures Television
2000s English-language films